From their inception in 1884 through their last year in Brooklyn, 1957, the Brooklyn Dodgers (also known as the Trolley Dodgers, Grooms, Bridegrooms, Superbas, and Robins at various times in their history) used 41 different starting pitchers on Opening Day.  Brickyard Kennedy made the most Opening Day starts for the Brooklyn Dodgers, with 6 such starts between 1894 and 1900.   Nap Rucker made 5 such starts between 1907 and 1913.  Carl Erskine made 4 Opening Day starts between 1951 and 1955 and Van Mungo also made 4 Opening Day starts between 1934 and 1938. Five Brooklyn pitchers made 3 Opening Day starts: Leon Cadore, Watty Clark, Don Newcombe, Jesse Petty, Dutch Ruether. The first game of the new baseball season for a team is played on Opening Day, and being named the Opening Day starter is an honor, which is often given to the player who is expected to lead the pitching staff that season, though there are various strategic reasons why a team's best pitcher might not start on Opening Day.

The Dodgers played in the modern World Series nine times before moving to Los Angeles, winning once in 1955, when Carl Esrkine was the Opening Day pitcher.  Erskine was also the Opening Day pitcher in 1953 when they played in the World Series but lost to the New York Yankees.  Joe Hatten also had two Opening Day starts in World Series years, 1947 and 1949.  Other Opening Day starting pitchers in World Series years were Larry Cheney in 1916, Leon Cadore in 1920, Whit Wyatt in 1941, Preacher Roe in 1952, and Don Newcombe in 1956.

Prior to the existence of the modern World Series, the Dodgers won National League championships in 1890, 1899 and 1900.  They also won an American Association championship in 1889, when the American Association was considered a Major League.  They played in the 19th century version of the World Series in 1889 and 1890.  Mickey Hughes was the Opening Day starting pitcher in 1889, Bob Caruthers was the Opening Day starting pitcher in 1890, and Kennedy was the Opening Day starting pitcher in 1899 and 1900.

Don Newcombe was the starting pitcher in 1956, the last Opening Day that the Dodgers played in their longtime home field, Ebbets Field.  Newcombe was also the Opening Day starter on Opening Day of the 1957 season, the Dodgers last Opening Day before moving to Los Angeles.  Nap Rucker was the Opening Day starting pitcher in the last Opening Day the team (then called the Trolley Dodgers) played at their previous home park, Washington Park, in 1912.  Rucker was also the Opening Day pitcher in the first game at Ebbets Field in 1913.

Joe Hatten was the Opening Day starting pitcher in one of the most momentous games in baseball history.  That was in 1947, the years of Jackie Robinson's first game in the Major Leagues, ending the racial segregation that had prevailed in Major League Baseball since before 1900.  The Joe Hatten started and the Dodgers won Jackie Robinson's first major league game, beating the Boston Braves 5–3 at Ebbets Field.

Key

Pitchers

References
General
  Covers 1919 through 1957.

Specific

Opening day starters
Lists of Major League Baseball Opening Day starting pitchers
Los Angeles Dodgers lists